Danielle Polanco is an American dancer and choreographer and actress. She is best known for being the leading lady in Omarion's music video Touch and for starring in the 2008 movie Step Up 2: The Streets, in which she portrayed Missy Serrano.

Polanco has choreographed for Janet Jackson, Jennifer Lopez and Beyoncé Knowles. She has also appeared as a dancer in numerous music videos for artists such as Jennifer Lopez, Beyoncé, Amerie, Janet Jackson, Usher, Bruno Mars, and Kat DeLuna. She is a voguer under the House of Ninja.

She appeared in the Broadway revival of West Side Story as one of the Shark girls, Consuela.

Filmography

Videography

Tony Touch's "Dimelo" — dancer
Ment 2B's "Wassup Wassup" — dancer
MVP's "Roc Ya Body (Mic Check 1, 2)" (2003) — dancer
Widelife feat. Simone Denny's "All Things (Queer Eye Theme)" (2003) — dancer
Young Gunz's "Friday Night" (2004) — dancer
Amerie's "1 Thing" (2005) — dancer
Amerie's  "Touch" (2005) — dancer
Omarion's "Touch" (2005) — dancer
Omarion's "I'm Tryna" (2005) — appearance
Beyoncé's "Check On It" (2005) — dancer
Ricky Martin's "Drop It On Me" (2005) — dancer
LL Cool J featuring Jennifer Lopez's "Control Myself" (2006) — dancer
Janet Jackson featuring Khia's "So Excited" (2006) — dancer and Choreographer
Beyoncé's "Get Me Bodied" (2007) — dancer and Choreographer
Beyoncé's "Suga Mama" (2007) — dancer and Choreographer
Beyoncé's "Freakum Dress" (2007) — dancer
Nelly's "Wadsyaname" (2007) — dancer
Kat DeLuna's "Whine Up" (2007) — dancer
Usher featuring Young Jeezy's "Love In This Club" (2008) — dancer
Chris Brown's "Forever" (2008) — dancer
Ne-Yo's "Miss Independent" (2008) — dancer
Jennifer Lopez's "Fresh Out the Oven" — Choreographer
Jennifer Lopez's "Good Hit" (Viral Video) (2011) — dancer and choreographer
 Lady Gaga's "Born This Way" (2011) — dancer
Lady Gaga's "Judas" (2011) — dancer
Beyoncé's "Run The World (Girls)" (2011) — dancer and choreographer
Beyoncé's "Countdown" (2011) — dancer and choreographer
Daddy Yankee's "Limbo" (2012) — dancer and choreographer
Kelly Rowland's "Ice" (2012) — dancer
Fergie's "A Little Party Never Killed Nobody (All We Got)" (2013) — dancer
Beyoncé's "Partition" (2013) — Choreographer
Jennifer Lopez's "Same Girl" (2014) — dancer
Jennifer Lopez's "I Luh Ya Papi" (2014) — dancer
Jolin Tsai's "I'm Not Yours" (2014) — Choreographer
Bruno Mars' "Finesse" (2018) - dancer
Janet Jackson featuring Daddy Yankee "Made For Now" (2018) - dancer and Choreographer
Jason Derulo Lay Zhang featuring NCT 127 "Let's Shut Up and Dance" (2019) - Choreographer

References

External links

Living people
American choreographers
American female dancers
Dancers from New York (state)
American film actresses
Actresses from New York City
People from the Bronx
21st-century American actresses
Year of birth missing (living people)